Aditya Shanware (born 18 August 1991) is an Indian cricketer who plays for Vidarbha. He made his first-class debut in the 2015–16 Ranji Trophy on 1 October 2015.

References

External links
 

1991 births
Living people
Indian cricketers
Vidarbha cricketers
Cricketers from Nagpur